Erand is a suburb of Midrand, South Africa. It is in located in Region A of the City of Johannesburg Metropolitan Municipality.

History
Originally an agricultural holding near Halfway House, it was name after the owner Erasmus of the farm Randjiesfontein.

References

Johannesburg Region A